Here is the list of cities in Punjab, Pakistan, by area. In this list only the area of each city is considered, not that of villages.

Punjab

References

Punjab, Pakistan by area
 
Punjab, Pakistan